Turbina is an urban barangay of Calamba in Laguna. It is geographically situated in the south of the city. Turbina is known for the barangay terminal station of Calamba, located at the Maharlika Highway, which is accessible by South Luzon Expressway's Calamba Exit.

Neighboring barangays

Population

References

External links
Official Website of the Government of Laguna

Barangays of Calamba, Laguna